Yonder was a Southern restaurant in Portland, Oregon. Chef Maya Lovelace opened Yonder in northeast Portland's Cully neighborhood in 2019. The business was named one of the city's ten best new restaurants of 2019 by The Oregonian and was featured on an episode of the Food Network's Diners, Drive-Ins and Dives in 2020. Yonder closed on June 26, 2022, when Lovelace converted the space into Hissyfit.

Description  
The fast casual restaurant Yonder served Southern cuisine in northeast Portland's Cully neighborhood. The menu focused on fried chicken and also included cornmeal-fried catfish and grilled pimento cheese sandwiches; sides included bacon-braised collard greens, pimento macaroni and cheese, and bread-and-butter zucchini pickles.

History

Yonder opened in 2019, in a Jane Dough building space which previously housed Delphina's Bakery. The restaurant began offering weekend brunch service in August. In 2020, Yonder was featured on the tenth episode ("Chicken and Pie") of the 32nd season of the Food Network's Diners, Drive-Ins and Dives. The restaurant also hosted pop-up dinners.

In 2022, chef Maya Lovelace announced plans to close Yonder on June 26 and "transition" into Hissyfit. Eater Portland attributed the closure to the COVID-19 pandemic.  Lovelace said: 

One month after Hissyfit's July opening, Lovelace announced the restaurant's permanent closure and her departure from the Portland restaurant industry.

Reception 
Michael Russell included Yonder in The Oregonian's list of "Portland's 10 best new restaurants of 2019". The restaurant has appeared in multiple Eater Portland lists, including ones for "impressive cocktails", "buzziest" new breakfasts and brunches, "top-notch" macaroni and cheese, "serious" cornbread, and "outstanding" fried chicken sandwiches.

See also

 COVID-19 pandemic in Portland, Oregon
 Impact of the COVID-19 pandemic on the restaurant industry in the United States
 List of defunct restaurants of the United States
 List of Diners, Drive-Ins and Dives episodes
 List of Southern restaurants

References

External links 

 
 Yonder at the Food Network

2019 establishments in Oregon
2022 disestablishments in Oregon
Cully, Portland, Oregon
Defunct restaurants in Portland, Oregon
Restaurants disestablished during the COVID-19 pandemic
Restaurants disestablished in 2022
Restaurants established in 2019
Southern restaurants